Agrotis tephrias (Kauai agrotis noctuid moth) was a moth in the family Noctuidae. It is now an extinct species.

Before its extinction within the last century, it was endemic to Kauai, Hawaii, United States.

Sources

 2006 IUCN Red List of Threatened Species.   
Hawaii's Extinct Species - Insects

Agrotis
Endemic moths of Hawaii
Moths described in 1899